Dick's Picks Volume 15 is the 15th live album in the Dick's Picks series of releases by the Grateful Dead. It features the complete show recorded on September 3, 1977, at Raceway Park in Englishtown, New Jersey.  Also appearing at the event were the New Riders of the Purple Sage and The Marshall Tucker Band.

Comparisons to unofficial releases reveal that there is an edit to the song "He's Gone," removing a mistake by Garcia where he repeated the song's chorus rather than singing the bridge.

This was the first Dick's Picks released after the death of Dick Latvala for whom the series is named. The liner notes include a picture of Latvala with the following message:

This is the first Dick's Picks to use the High Definition Compatible Digital (HDCD) CD format.

Enclosure and review

The release includes two pieces of paper stapled together in the middle, yielding an eight-page enclosure.  The front duplicates the cover of the CD and the back contains a circular drawing of a grey cyclopes skull with a single crossbone backed by blue sky with some clouds.

Inside, the first page on the left features a color photograph of the band on stage, and the page on the right lists the contents of and credits for the release.  The two pages in the middle contain a two-page review of the show, and the last two pages contain a small photograph of Dick Latvala and a large photo, from high up and behind the stage, of the crowd at the show.  The "People of Earth" message mentioned previously appears on the bottom of the left side of these two pages, under the photo of Dick.

Review by Martha Megill

The titles of the review are "Concert Attendance Takes Planning", in fine print, above "Grateful Dead Fan Is Happy, Satisfied" in bold typeface.  The review is an account of the show from the Asbury Park Press, dated 9/6/77 and written in the first person by Martha Megill.

The review is very personal and starts by describing Megill's three-mile walk from where she and her friends parked to the concert area.  After describing a few ways she and her friends found to mitigate the hot weather, the author briefly mentions being barely able to hear the shows by the backup bands, the New Riders of the Purple Sage and The Marshall Tucker Band.

About two-thirds of the way through the article Martha mentions that "by 6 p.m. the air had cooled slightly," and it was finally "time for the Dead."  Although the first song "proved to be no louder than the previous music," she writes that "the sound improved gradually" and "by the last set the sound was great."

Megill claims that their song "Truckin' ", the last song before the encore, was "the highlight of the entire day" and that the "One hundred thousand people [in attendance] were ecstatic."  She then ends the article by stating that she agrees "wholeheartedly with the many bumper stickers I saw.  'There Ain't Nothin' Like a Grateful Dead Concert'."  She closes her review by asserting that everyone there heard "some excellent music" and had "a real good time."

Track listing
Disc one
First set:
"Introduction" (Scher) – 0:41
"Promised Land" (Chuck Berry) – 5:08
"They Love Each Other" (Jerry Garcia, Robert Hunter) – 7:41
"Me & My Uncle" (John Phillips) – 3:52
"Mississippi Half-Step Uptown Toodleloo" (Garcia, Hunter) – 13:34
"Looks Like Rain" (Bob Weir, John Barlow) – 7:52
"Peggy-O" (traditional) – 9:18
"New Minglewood Blues" (Noah Lewis) – 5:20
"Friend of the Devil" (Garcia, John Dawson, Hunter) – 8:13
"The Music Never Stopped" (Weir, Barlow) – 7:03
Disc two
Second set:
"Bertha" (Garcia, Hunter) – 8:35 →
"Good Lovin'" (Rudy Clark, Arthur Resnick) – 6:00
"Loser" (Garcia, Hunter) – 8:37
"Estimated Prophet" (Barlow, Weir) – 9:29 →
"Eyes of the World" (Garcia, Hunter) – 13:17
"Samson and Delilah" (Rev. Gary Davis) – 6:40
Disc three
"He's Gone" (Garcia, Hunter) – 14:18 →
"Not Fade Away" (Buddy Holly, Norman Petty) – 19:58 →
"Truckin'" (Garcia, Phil Lesh, Weir, Hunter) – 10:05
Encore:
"Terrapin Station" (Garcia, Hunter) – 11:02

Personnel
Grateful Dead:
Jerry Garcia – lead guitar, vocals
Bill Kreutzmann – drums
Mickey Hart – drums
Phil Lesh – bass, vocals
Bob Weir – guitar, vocals
Donna Jean Godchaux – vocals
Keith Godchaux – keyboards
Production:
Dick Latvala – tape archivist
Gecko Graphics – design
Betty Cantor-Jackson  – recording
Jeffrey Norman – CD mastering
John Cutler – magnetic scrutinizer
Jim Anderson, John Oliver – photography
Martha Megill – liner notes; from Asbury Park Press September 6, 1977.

See also
Dick's Picks series
Grateful Dead discography

References

15
1999 live albums